Abdirizak Omar Mohamed is a Somali politician. He was Minister of Natural Resources in Abdi Farah Shirdon cabinet from November 8, 2012 till the cabinet was ousted in December 2, 2013, and then moved on to become the Senior Policy Advisor to the President of Somalia Hassan Sheikh Mohamud. He was the Minister of Petroleum, Water and Natural Resources of Somalia a few days in early 2015. He is the former Minister of Internal Security of Somalia, having been appointed to the position on 6 February 2015 by the former Prime Minister Omar Abdirashid Ali Sharmarke.

References

Living people
Government ministers of Somalia
Year of birth missing (living people)